Gaura is a village in the (Mirzapur District) of the Indian state of Uttar Pradesh. It is situated at about 7;km from Gigna  Railway station towards Ganga river.

Population: 200 peoples (approx)
Land:
Sex Ratio:
Education Percentage:65%

Villages in Mirzapur district